The 2007–08 CERS Cup was the 28th season of the CERS Cup, Europe's second club roller hockey competition organized by CERH. 27 teams from eight national associations qualified for the competition as a result of their respective national league placing in the previous season. Following a preliminary phase and two knockout rounds, Tenerife won the tournament in the Final Four, that was played in Dinan, France.

Tenerife achieved their first title ever.

Preliminary phase 

|}

Knockout stage
The knockout stage consisted in double-legged series for the round of 16 and the quarterfinals, where the four winners would join the Final Four, that was played in Dinan, France.

See also
2006–07 CERH European League
2008 CERH Women's European Cup

References

External links
 CERH website
 RinkHockey.net

World Skate Europe Cup
CERS Cup
CERS Cup